James Robert Niven Taylor (11 August 1929 – 14 July 2019) was a Scottish cricketer. He played four matches of first-class cricket for Scotland and Bengal between 1949 and 1953.

See also
 List of Bengal cricketers

References

External links
 

1929 births
2019 deaths
Scottish cricketers
Bengal cricketers
Cricketers from Kolkata